Beknaz Almazbekov (born 23 June 2005) is a Kyrgyz footballer who plays as a forward for Turkish club Galatasaray.

Club career
Born in Kyrgyzstan, Almazbekov moved to Turkey as a child, as his brother had received an offer to study at a university there. He had played football in his homeland with Alga Bishkek, and was invited to join Galatasaray shortly after his arrival in Turkey. As he was under 18 at the time, the move came under investigation from UEFA, who found no fault, as Almazbekov had not moved to Turkey solely for football-related purposes.

In 2019, while playing for the Galatasaray youth team, he made international headlines by deliberately missing a penalty that he felt the referee had unfairly awarded to his team. The following year, after continuing his good form with the Galatasaray youth teams, he was named by the AFC as one of the best young players in Central Asia.

In February 2022, he was promoted to the first team at the age of 16. He made his unofficial debut in a 3–1 friendly loss to Ukrainian side Dynamo Kyiv, as part of the Global Tour for Peace, coming on as a substitute for Emre Kılınç.

In September of the same year, he was named by English newspaper The Guardian as one of the best players born in 2005 worldwide.

International career
Almazbekov has represented Kyrgyzstan at youth international level. In May 2022, he was called up to the senior Kyrgyzstan national football team for 2023 AFC Asian Cup qualification matches.

Personal life
Almazbekov has named former Galatasaray player Wesley Sneijder as an inspiration to him.

Career statistics

International

References

External links
 

2005 births
Living people
Sportspeople from Bishkek
Kyrgyzstani footballers
Kyrgyzstan international footballers
Kyrgyzstan youth international footballers
Association football forwards
FC Alga Bishkek players
Galatasaray S.K. footballers
Expatriate footballers in Turkey